Arctocetraria is a genus of foliose lichens in the family Parmeliaceae. It has three species.

Taxonomy

The genus was circumscribed by lichenologists Ingvar Kärnefelt and Arne Thell in 1993, with Arctocetraria andrejevii assigned as the type species.

In 2017, Pradeep Divakar and colleagues used a then-recently developed "temporal phylogenetic" approach to identify temporal bands for specific taxonomic ranks in the family Parmeliaceae, suggesting that groups of species that diverged within the time window of 29.45–32.55 million years ago represent genera. They proposed to synonymize Arctocetraria with Nephromopsis, along with several other Parmelioid genera, so that all the genera within the Parmeliaceae are about the same age. Although some of their proposed taxonomic changes were accepted, the synonymization of the Parmelioid genera with Nephromopsis was not accepted in a later critical analysis of the temporal phylogenetic approach for fungal classification.

Species
Arctocetraria andrejevii 
Arctocetraria nigricascens 
Arctocetraria simmonsii

References

Parmeliaceae
Lecanorales genera
Lichen genera
Taxa described in 1993
Taxa named by Ingvar Kärnefelt